Patricio Iván Monti (born 15 January 1998) is an Argentine professional footballer who plays as a midfielder.

Career
Monti's career got underway in Gimnasia y Esgrima's academy. He was promoted into first-team football in May 2018 for a match with Independiente, with his professional bow subsequently arriving as the midfielder was substituted on for Matías Gómez on sixty-six minutes. That was his only appearance in 2017–18, though he was an unused substitute on two further occasions.

Career statistics
.

References

External links

1998 births
Living people
Place of birth missing (living people)
Argentine footballers
Association football midfielders
Argentine Primera División players
Primera Nacional players
Club de Gimnasia y Esgrima La Plata footballers
Estudiantes de Río Cuarto footballers